Inspector Montalbano may refer to:

Inspector Montalbano (TV series)
Salvo Montalbano, the eponymous character in the above TV series and an earlier series of novels and short stories

See also
Montalbano (disambiguation)
The Young Montalbano, a prequel to the Inspector Montalbano TV series